Doctor Double X (originally called Doctor X and Double X) is a supervillain appearing in comics published by DC Comics. He has fought Batman several times in Gotham City.

Publication history
Doctor Double X first appeared in Detective Comics #261 (November 1958), in a story titled "The Amazing Dr. Double X" by Bob Kane, writer Dave Wood and artist Sheldon Moldoff.

Fictional character biography
Dr. Simon Ecks is a scientist who discovered that human auras could be enhanced to function outside of the body. When Ecks created an energy-duplicate of himself, the introverted scientist's unstable mind became dominated by the doppelgänger he named Double X. He fought with Batman and Robin. The resulting battle causes Ecks to lose his memory of the experience. He is remanded to Arkham Asylum.<ref>Detective Comics #261</ref>

Some years later, Ecks regained his memory and developed another duplicator device that enabled him to escape from Arkham Asylum. Doctor Double X matched wits once again with Batman. This time, Batman was able to defeat him by building his own machine that generated an energy duplicate of himself.

Doctor Double X later escaped from Arkham Asylum and faced off against Batman and Superman. This time, it took both Batman and Superman to overcome him.

Doctor Double X once traded opponents with Rainbow Raider after meeting the motivational therapist Professor Andrea Wye. Both of them are defeated by Batman and Flash.

Doctor Double X was later seen as a guest at the San Francisco sci-fi convention. He was sitting next to Beast Boy who learned that Doctor Double X was washed up and forgotten.

In "The New 52", a reboot of the DC Comics universe, Batwing encounters Dr. Simon Ecks in the tunnels beneath Arkham Asylum. While he informs that most of the Arkham Asylum staff was either taken or killed, he warns Batwing to stay back as there is something inside that wants to kill. As a spirit rises from his body and starts to reach towards Batwing, Jim Corrigan shows up and knocks out Ecks as he states that the spirit is a Tulpa. When Batman dispels a ghost in a cemetery, it causes the supposed death of a man wearing an ID badge that has his name on it. Batman then has Julia Pennyworth contact Batwing to look up any info on Ecks.

Powers and abilities
Doctor Double X's energy-duplicate shares his consciousness, but can also act alone. It also has the powers of flight, super strength, and creating energy blasts, but requires regular infusions of electrical energy to sustain itself or else it will become dormant.

In other media
Television
 Doctor Double X appears in the Batman: The Brave and the Bold episode "A Bat Divided!", voiced by Ron Perlman. He attempts to cause a radioactive meltdown to increase his powers, but unknowingly merges Jason Rusch and Ronnie Raymond into Firestorm and splits Batman into three entities. Double X later kidnaps Firestorm to absorb the latter's radioactive energy, but Batman rescues him before battling and defeating Double X.
 Dr. Simon Ecks appears in Young Justice: Outsiders, voiced by Troy Baker. This version is a metahuman with the ability to duplicate himself and a world-renowned geneticist who operates in a children's hospital in Markovia while secretly experimenting on children to activate their metagene on Baron Bedlam's behalf.

Film
 According to concept art, Doctor Double X was originally planned to appear in The Lego Batman Movie.
 Doctor Double X appears in Scooby-Doo! & Batman: The Brave and the Bold.

Miscellaneous
Doctor Double X appears in Justice League Adventures'' #29.

See also
 List of Batman Family enemies

References

External links
 Doctor Double X at DC Comics Wiki
 Doctor Double X at Comic Vine

Batman characters
Characters created by Bob Kane
Characters created by Sheldon Moldoff
Comics characters introduced in 1958
DC Comics male supervillains
Fictional inventors
Fictional parapsychologists
DC Comics metahumans